The 1924 Summer Student World Championships was the second edition of the global sports competition for student-athletes, organised by the Confederation Internationale des Etudiants (CIE). Held from 17–20 September in Warsaw, Poland, seven nations competed in the men's only programme. The seven nations were England, Estonia, France, Italy, New Zealand, Poland and the United States. A total of five sports were contested: athletics, fencing, association football, rowing and tennis.

Athletics medal summary

Athletics medal table

Participating nations

References
World Student Games (Pre-Universiade) - GBR Athletics

Summer World University Games
Athletics at the Summer Universiade
Summer Student World Championships
Summer Student World Championships
Multi-sport events in Poland
Sports competitions in Warsaw
20th century in Warsaw
Summer Student World Championships
Student sport in Poland
International athletics competitions hosted by Poland
September 1924 sports events